Raymond Crawshaw (12 August 1908 – 31 December 1974) was an English professional footballer who played in the Football League for Accrington Stanley and Birmingham. He played as a centre half.

Crawshaw was born in Padiham, Lancashire. He began his football career with local team Great Harwood, and had spells with Southport and Burnley, but without playing in the Football League. He joined Accrington Stanley in 1933, and played 19 games in the Third Division North before moving to First Division club Birmingham in April 1934 for a fee of £600. The form of George Morrall and Tom Fillingham restricted Crawshaw's appearances to four, and he returned to non-league football in 1934.

References

1908 births
1974 deaths
People from Padiham
English footballers
Association football defenders
Great Harwood F.C. players
Southport F.C. players
Burnley F.C. players
Accrington Stanley F.C. (1891) players
Birmingham City F.C. players
Bromsgrove Rovers F.C. players
English Football League players